Mohammadreza Jalaeipour (born 1982) is an Iranian sociologist and political activist.

Life
He is the son of Hamidreza Jalaeipour. Mohammadreza Jalaeipour has been a PhD student at St Antony's College, University of Oxford.

He was a founder of pro-reformist Third Wave campaign in Iranian presidential election, 2009.

Detentions
Jalaeipour has been detained on a number of occasions by the Iranian authorities. While still a student at Oxford University in June 2009 he was prevented from returning to England after visiting Iran, without his family knowing where he was taken.
He was arrested again in June 2010 in Tehran and kept in solitary confinement before being transferred to a prison in Mashhad. He was released in August 2010 with bail of three billion rials, but was never charged. In April 2018 he was arrested in Iran and held without charge for 77 days.

Awards and honors
 Placed 1st in Iranian University Entrance Exam (2003) 
 Gold medal. Iranian Literature Olympiad (2002)

References

1982 births
Iranian activists
University of Tehran alumni
Political activists
Iranian reformists
Alumni of the London School of Economics
Political sociologists
Sociologists of religion
Living people
Iranian sociologists
Faculty of Social Sciences of the University of Tehran alumni